Charles Hadley (September 30, 1846 – June 28, 1897), nicknamed "The Professor", was an African American boxer who was the third World Colored Heavyweight Champion, reigning from January 14, 1881, to February 23, 1883. The 5′9½″ boxer fought out of Bridgeport, Connecticut as a heavyweight.

Fights with Morris Grant
Hadley won the colored heavyweight championship from  Morris Grant, whom he fought twelve times between 1881 and 1883. Their first recorded match was January 14, 1881, when Hadley won points in a three-rounder and claimed the Grant's title.

Hadley fought Grant a 10 more times while he was the colored champ, beating him eight times. In their seventh fight, held on May 4, 1882, in  New York City, their four-rounder was declared a no-contest. Their next fight, on June 20 of the same year, saw Morris finally beat the undefeated  Hadley (whose "official" record was 12-0-2 at the time), besting the champ on points in a four rounder. Hadley apparently did not put his belt at stake for the fight, for he continued as champion until 1883, when he was finally bested by George "Old Chocolate" Godfrey.

Morris lost three more fights to Hadley during his championship reign and one after Hadley lost his title to Godfrey. The last time they battled while Hadley was the colored champ was on December 7, 1882, when they fought in New York City for the Police Gazette Medal Championship of America. Hadley KO-ed Morris in the third round. Their last fight was on December 8, 1883-12-08, exactly one year and one day after they had last met in the ring. Morris apparently was outpointed by the ex-champ and retired from pro boxing.

Record
In a career that lasted from 1869 to 1891, Hadley racked up a record of 25 wins (14 by knock-out) against 13 losses (being KO-ed five times) with six draws.

Legacy & Honors

In 2020 award-winning author Mark Allen Baker published the first comprehensive account of The World Colored Heavyweight Championship, 1876–1937, with McFarland & Company, a leading independent publisher of academic & nonfiction books. This history traces the advent and demise of the Championship, the stories of the talented professional athletes who won it, and the demarcation of the color line both in and out of the ring.

For decades the World Colored Heavyweight Championship was a useful tool to combat racial oppression-the existence of the title a leverage mechanism, or tool, used as a technique to counter a social element, “drawing the color line.”

Professional boxing record

References

1846 births
Boxers from Tennessee
Heavyweight boxers
African-American boxers
World colored heavyweight boxing champions
Sportspeople from Nashville, Tennessee
1897 deaths
American male boxers